Hesychotypa balia is a species of beetle in the family Cerambycidae. It was described by Martins and Galileo in 2009. It is known from Bolivia.

References

balia
Beetles described in 2009